Neoplecostomus watersi is a species of catfish in the family Loricariidae. It is native to South America, where it occurs in the upper Paraná River basin in the state of Goiás in Brazil. It is typically found at the bottom of clear rivers with rocky substrates. The species reaches 7 cm (2.8 inches) in standard length. Its specific name, watersi, honors Roger Waters of Pink Floyd.

References 

watersi
Fish described in 2019
Catfish of South America
Freshwater fish of Brazil